Yandé Island is a 1,300 ha island lying some 20 km off the northern end of Grande Terre, the principal island of the French Territory of New Caledonia in Melanesia in the south-west Pacific Ocean.

Description
The island is about 6 km long by 4 km wide with a maximum height of 300 m. It is formed of peridotites and has a rugged terrain with steep slopes and rocky coasts. The eastern and northern coast has steep cliffs and small sandy bays located at valley outlets. The west coast has gentler topography with a fringing reef enclosing a lagoon with coastal mangroves. Much of the island is covered with scrub vegetation, but there are areas of dry forest and niaouli.

Important Bird Area
The island has been recognised as an Important Bird Area (IBA) by BirdLife International because it supports populations of red-bellied fruit doves, white-bellied goshawks, grey-eared honeyeaters, New Caledonian myzomelas, fan-tailed gerygones, New Caledonian whistlers, long-tailed trillers, Melanesian flycatchers, green-backed white-eyes and striated starlings. The island is also home to the only known population of the island thrush subspecies Turdus poliocephalus xanthopus.

References

 
Important Bird Areas of New Caledonia
Islands of New Caledonia